Ever Green, Ever Rain is the debut studio album by American singer-songwriter Michael McArthur. It was released on January 25, 2019,

The album was recorded in Los Angeles at United Recording Studios with producer Ryan Freeland, and is the first release on McArthur's record label Dark River Records.

Reception
The album received a positive reception from Billboard, popmatters, and Cowboys & Indians magazine.

Track listing

Personnel
 Michael McArthur – guitar, lead vocals, background vocals
 Ryan Freeland – producer, engineer, mixing
 Monique Evelyn – assistant engineer
 Kim Rosen – mastering
 Steven Nistor – drums, percussion
 Paul Bryan – bass guitar, background vocals
 Lee Pardini – piano, synth
 Jebin Bruni – piano, synth
 Josh Davis – electric guitar
 Dan Kalisher – electric guitar
 Kristin Mooney – background vocals
 Matt Scott Barnes – design
 Michael Flores – photography
 Michael McArthur – photography
 Jack Catterall – photography

References

2019 debut albums